Portugal competed at the 2016 European Athletics Championships in Amsterdam, Netherlands, between 6 and 10 July 2016. On 27 June 2016, the Portuguese Athletics Federation announced the list of 33 athletes taking part in the championships, which included 16 men and 17 women.

Medalists

Results

Men

Track & road events

Field events

Women

Track & road events

Field events

References

European Athletics Championships
2016
Nations at the 2016 European Athletics Championships